Mike Pringle may refer to:

 Mike Pringle (gridiron football) (born 1967), American former professional gridiron football player
 Mike Pringle (physician) (born 1950), English general practitioner
 Mike Pringle (politician) (born 1945), Scottish Liberal Democrat politician